Camorim is a neighborhood of Rio de Janeiro, Brazil.

Neighbourhoods in Rio de Janeiro (city)